Kimberly Brooke Spradlin-Wolfe (born January 30, 1983) is an interior designer and former bridal shop owner from San Antonio, Texas. She is best known as the winner of 2012's Survivor: One World and its $1 million prize. She was also named the Sprint "Player of the Season" as voted by the show's fans, winning her another $100,000. In 2020, she returned for the show's 40th season, Survivor: Winners at War, to compete against past winners in the Survivor franchise. On that season, she placed ninth.

Survivor

One World
In spite of being one of the quieter contestants of Survivor: One World, Spradlin caught the attention of Alicia Rosa during the trek to the girl's camp because she posed as a strong player which forged her into Rosa's alliance along with Chelsea Meissner, Kat Edorsson, and Sabrina Thompson. Spradlin, and the rest of the Salani tribe then prospered, winning three consecutive challenges, and received free immunity when the Manono tribe decided to go to Tribal Council despite winning the Day 11 Immunity Challenge.

Following Spradlin's victories at the last two Immunity Challenges, she found herself in the Final Three with Meissner and Thompson. Spradlin's quiet and effective strategy earned the respect of seven of the nine Jury members, crowning her as the 24th Sole Survivor. She was awarded $1 million for winning the Survivor contest, and $100,000 more as the Sprint Player of the Season, which was awarded by viewer votes.

Winners at War
Eight years later, Kim Spradlin-Wolfe (now using her married name) returned to compete on Survivor: Winners at War. Spradlin-Wolfe began on the Dakal tribe. After losing immunity on Day Three, Spradlin-Wolfe alongside Amber Mariano and Tyson Apostol were perceived as a Poker alliance due to herself, Apostol, Jeremy Collins and "Boston Rob" Mariano playing poker on TV about a year prior, making them targets as a result. Spradlin-Wolfe received three votes at Tribal Council but was saved when Amber Mariano was voted out. The following morning Spradlin-Wolfe found a hidden immunity idol but learned that she had to give one half of the idol to someone on her tribe before sundown for the idol to be active. She gave one half to Sophie Clarke. Before the Tribe Switch, Clarke gave it back.

After reaching the merge, Spradlin-Wolfe became a part of the majority high-profile alliance. Spradlin-Wolfe won immunity on Day 23. On Day 25, she played her idol on ally Denise Stapley after former ally Sarah Lacina used her vote steal, but she ended up wasting it as Lacina's alliance voted out Apostol. At the Final Eight, she attempted to target Tony Vlachos for being too big of a threat, but her plan was ruined when he won immunity. After learning from his ally Ben Driebergen that Spradlin-Wolfe was targeting him, Vlachos organized her elimination. Spradlin-Wolfe lost the re-entry duel on Day 35 and finished in ninth place.

At the Final Tribal Council, Spradlin-Wolfe was one of 12 jury members who voted for Vlachos to win.

Other media appearances
Soon after winning the $1 million prize on Survivor: One World, Spradlin appeared on the CBS daytime talk show The Talk, where she said she would use the money to improve her San Antonio bridal shop, and to take vacations. She also said she planned on being "generous" with family and friends. Shortly thereafter, she signed on with KENS, San Antonio's CBS affiliate, as an on-air contributor for the television show Great Day SA, where she did a segment called "Kim's Kart."  She served in that capacity until 2016, when she left the station to focus on her interior design work for Kate Kingman Interiors.

In 2013, English professor Ellen Sorg name-dropped Spradlin in an essay which compared Survivor winners to Ken Jennings, a software engineer with a notable 74-game winning streak on Jeopardy! Using Spradlin as an example, Sorg wrote that Spradlin won on Survivor because of a combination of practical and interpersonal intelligence, and suggested that Jennings, though very knowledgeable on many topics, would not fare as well on Survivor because the ability to recall many facts is not as valuable in daily life as overall intelligence is.

Personal life
Spradlin attended and graduated from the University of Texas at San Antonio. She married Bryan Wolfe over the weekend of March 16–17, 2013, in Cabo San Lucas, Mexico, on a private beach near their hotel. Her fellow Survivor tribemates Alicia Rosa and Kat Edorsson attended. About one month later, after going to change her name at the DMV in San Antonio, Spradlin-Wolfe was arrested due to a case of mistaken identity. She spent eight hours in jail when a staff member saw there was a warrant out for her arrest for check bouncing. However, after bailing herself out for $1,500, it turned out that there was another person with the same first name and birthday. She later stated: "Be careful at the DMV, ya never know what's going to happen."

In July 2013, Spradlin-Wolfe announced she was pregnant with her first child. She gave birth to a son, Michael Thomas Wolfe, on February 8, 2014. Her second child, a daughter named August Jane Wolfe, was born May 27, 2015. Her second son and third child in 27 months, Walt, was born on June 1, 2016.

As of October 2020, she was self-employed as the owner of Kim Wolfe Home, a business which focuses on interior design and home renovation.

References

External links
 Survivor: One World biography at CBS.com

1983 births
21st-century American businesspeople
Businesspeople from Texas
Living people
People from San Antonio
Survivor (American TV series) winners
University of Texas at San Antonio alumni
Winners in the Survivor franchise